Vajpayee ministry may refer to:

First Vajpayee ministry, the Indian government headed by Atal Bihari Vajpayee in 1996
Second Vajpayee ministry, the Indian government headed by Atal Bihari Vajpayee from 1998 to 1999
Third Vajpayee ministry, the Indian government headed by Atal Bihari Vajpayee from 1999 to 2004

See also 
Atal Bihari Vajpayee (1924–2018)